Weather is the varied phenomena that can occur in the atmosphere of a planet. 

Weather may also refer to:

Weather forecasting and reporting
Weather (Apple), a preinstalled weather forecasting app on iPhones
MSN Weather, a weather service from Microsoft
The Weather Channel, an all-weather network owned by Entertainment Studios

Music
Weather (Meshell Ndegeocello album), 2011
Weather (Tycho album), 2019
Weather (Huey Lewis and the News album), 2020
Weathers (band)
The Weather (Busdriver & Radioinactive album), a 2003 hip hop album with Daedelus
The Weather (Pond album), 2017
"The Weather", a song by Built to Spill from their 2001 album Ancient Melodies of the Future

Literature
 Weather (novel), a novel by Jenny Offill
"Weather", a short story by Alastair Reynolds in his collection Galactic North, set in his Revelation Space universe

Other uses
Weathers (band)
Weathers (surname)